"Bhagyada balegara hogi ba" (Kannada: ಭಾಗ್ಯಾದ ಬಳೆಗಾರ ಹೋಗಿ ಬಾ, meaning Dear bangle seller, please go to my home town) is a popular Kannada folk song. The song is about a conversation between a newly married lady and a bangle seller. The lady asks the bangle seller to visit her parents' house, but the seller says that he does not know how to get there. The lady gives directions to her parents' hometown in a poetic way.

"Bhagyada balegara" is very popular in Karnataka and throughout South India. The song is a regular feature of folk music programmes in the state.

Many singers have covered this song, including K. S. Chitra, Madhu Balakrishnan, B. R. Chaya, SPB, Manjula Gururaj, Kasturi Shankar, Rathnamala Prakash, Nanditha, Shreya Ghoshal, Kunal Ganjawala, and Amma Ramachandra.

Lyrics

Text of the composition
               
          ಹೆಣ್ಣು ಮಗಳು:  
       ಭಾಗ್ಯದ ಬಳೆಗಾರ ಹೋಗಿ ಬಾ ನನ್ ತವರೀಗೇ  
       ಭಾಗ್ಯದ ಬಳೆಗಾರ ಹೋಗಿ ಬಾ ನನ್ ತವರೀಗೇ
            ಭಾಗ್ಯದ ಬಳೆಗಾರ ಹೋಗಿ ಬಾ ನನ್ ತವರೀಗೇ
            ಭಾಗ್ಯದ ಬಳೆಗಾರ ಹೋಗಿ ಬಾ ನನ್ ತವರೀಗೇ
 
            ಬಳೆಗಾರ :    
            ನಿನ್ನ ತವರೂರಾ ನಾನೇನು ಬಲ್ಲೆನು
            ನಿನ್ನ ತವರೂರಾ ನಾನೇನು ಬಲ್ಲೆನು
            ಗೊತ್ತಿಲ್ಲ ಎನಗೆ ಗುರಿಯಿಲ್ಲ ಎಲೆಬಾಲೆ
            ಗೊತ್ತಿಲ್ಲ ಎನಗೆ ಗುರಿಯಿಲ್ಲ ಎಲೆಬಾಲೆ
            ತೋರಿಸು ಬಾರೆ ತವರೂರ
 
            ಹೆಣ್ಣು ಮಗಳು : 
            ಭಾಗ್ಯದ ಬಳೆಗಾರ ಹೋಗಿ ಬಾ ನನ್ ತವರೀಗೇ
            ಭಾಗ್ಯದ ಬಳೆಗಾರ ಹೋಗಿ ಬಾ ನನ್ ತವರೀಗೇ
 
            ಬಾಳೆ ಬಲಕ್ಕೆ ಬೀಡು ಸೀಬೆ ಎಡಕ್ಕೆ ಬೀಡು
            ಬಾಳೆ ಬಲಕ್ಕೆ ಬೀಡು ಸೀಬೆ ಎಡಕ್ಕೆ ಬೀಡು
            ನಟ್ಟ ನಡುವೇಲ್ಲಿ ನೀ ಹೋಗು ಬಳೆಗಾರ
            ನಟ್ಟ ನಡುವೇಲ್ಲಿ ನೀ ಹೋಗು ಬಳೆಗಾರ
            ಅಲ್ಲಿಹುದೆನ್ನಾ ತವರೂರು
 
            ಬಳೆಗಾರ :    
            ಮುತ್ತೈದೆ ಎಲೆ ಹೆಣ್ಣೆ ತೋರು ಬಾ ನಿನ್ನ ತವರೂರಾ
            ಮುತ್ತೈದೆ ಎಲೆ ಹೆಣ್ಣೆ ತೋರು ಬಾ ನಿನ್ನ ತವರೂರಾ
 
           ಹೆಣ್ಣು ಮಗಳು: 
           ಹಂಚಿನಾ ಮನೆ ಕಾಣೋ ಕಂಚಿನಾ ಕದ ಕಾಣೋ
           ಹಂಚಿನಾ ಮನೆ ಕಾಣೋ ಕಂಚಿನಾ ಕದ ಕಾಣೋ
           ಇಂಚಾಡೋವೆರಡು ಗಿಳಿ ಕಾಣೋ ಬಳೆಗಾರ
           ಅಲ್ಲಿಹುದೆನ್ನಾ ತವರೂರು
 
           ಬಳೆಗಾರ:    
           ಮುತ್ತೈದೆ ಎಲೆ ಹೆಣ್ಣೆ ತೋರು ಬಾ ನಿನ್ನ ತವರೂರಾ
           ಮುತ್ತೈದೆ ಎಲೆ ಹೆಣ್ಣೆ ತೋರು ಬಾ ನಿನ್ನ ತವರೂರಾ
 
           ಹೆಣ್ಣು ಮಗಳು: 
           ಆಲೆ ಆಡುತ್ತಾವೇ ಗಾಣ ತಿರುಗುತ್ತಾವೇ
           ಆಲೆ ಆಡುತ್ತಾವೇ ಗಾಣ ತಿರುಗುತ್ತಾವೇ
           ನವಿಲು ಸಾರಂಗ ನಲಿದಾವೇ ಬಳೆಗಾರ
           ಅಲ್ಲಿಹುದೆನ್ನಾ ತವರೂರು
 
            ಬಳೆಗಾರ:    
           ಮುತ್ತೈದೆ ಎಲೆ ಹೆಣ್ಣೆ ತೋರು ಬಾ ನಿನ್ನ ತವರೂರಾ
           ಮುತ್ತೈದೆ ಎಲೆ ಹೆಣ್ಣೆ ತೋರು ಬಾ ನಿನ್ನ ತವರೂರಾ
 
           ಹೆಣ್ಣು ಮಗಳು: 
           ಮುತ್ತೈದೆ ಹಟ್ಟೀಲಿ ಮುತ್ತಿನ ಚಪ್ರ ಹಾಸಿ
           ಮುತ್ತೈದೆ ಹಟ್ಟೀಲಿ ಮುತ್ತಿನ ಚಪ್ರ ಹಾಸಿ
           ನಟ್ಟ ನಡುವೇಲ್ಲಿ ಪಗಡೆಯ ಆಡುತ್ತಾಳೆ
           ನಟ್ಟ ನಡುವೇಲ್ಲಿ ಪಗಡೆಯ ಆಡುತ್ತಾಳೆ
           ಅವಳೆ ಕಣೋ ನನ್ನ ಹಡೆದವ್ವ
 
              ಬಳೆಗಾರ:    
           ಮುತ್ತೈದೆ ಎಲೆ ಹೆಣ್ಣೆ ತೋರು ಬಾ ನಿನ್ನ ತವರೂರಾ
           ಮುತ್ತೈದೆ ಎಲೆ ಹೆಣ್ಣೆ ತೋರು ಬಾ ನಿನ್ನ ತವರೂರಾ
 
           ಹೆಣ್ಣು ಮಗಳು: 
           ಅಚ್ಚ ಕೆಂಪಿನ ಬಳೆ,ಹಸಿರು ಗೀರಿನ ಬಳೆ
           ಅಚ್ಚ ಕೆಂಪಿನ ಬಳೆ,ಹಸಿರು ಗೀರಿನ ಬಳೆ
           ನನ್ನ ಹಡೆದವ್ವಗೆ ಬಲು ಆಸೆ ಬಳೆಗಾರ
           ನನ್ನ ಹಡೆದವ್ವಗೆ ಬಲು ಆಸೆ ಬಳೆಗಾರ
           ಕೊಂಡು ಹೋಗೊ ನನ್ನ ತವರೀಗೆ
              ಭಾಗ್ಯದ ಬಳೆಗಾರ ಹೋಗಿ ಬಾ ನನ್ ತವರೀಗೇ
              ಭಾಗ್ಯದ ಬಳೆಗಾರ ಹೋಗಿ ಬಾ ನನ್ ತವರೀಗೇ
 
           ಬಳೆಗಾರ:   
           ನಿನ್ನ ತವರೂರ ನಾನೀಗ ಬಲ್ಲೆನು
           ಗೊತ್ತಾಯ್ತು ಎನಗೆ, ಗುರಿಯಾಯ್ತು ಎಲೆ ಹೆಣ್ಣೆ
           ಹೋಗಿ ಬರ್ತೀನಿ ನಿನ್ನ ತವರೀಗೆ

English transliteration
 
                 LADY :          
               Bhaagyada baLegaara hOgi bA nan thavarIgE
               Bhaagyada baLegaara hOgi bA nan thavarIgE
               
               BANGLE SELLER 
               ninna thavarUrA naanEnu ballenu
               ninna thavarUrA naanEnu ballenu
               goththilla enage guriyilla elebaale
               goththilla enage guriyilla elebaale
               thOrisu bAre thavarUra
                
               LADY:
               Bhaagyada baLegaara hOgi bA nan thavarIgE
               Bhaagyada baLegaara hOgi bA nan thavarIgE
   
                LADY:
               bALe balakke bIdu sIbe edakke bIdu
               bALe balakke bIdu sIbe edakke bIdu
               natta naduvElli nI hOgu baLegAra
               natta naduvElli nI hOgu baLegAra
               allihudhennA thavarUru
 
               BANGLE SELLER: 
               muththaidhe ele heNNe thOru bA nin thavarUrA
               muththaidhe ele heNNe thOru bA nin thavarUrA
 
                 LADY:          
               hanchina mane kANO kanchina kadha kANO
               hanchina mane kANO kanchina kadha kANO
               inchaadOveradu giLi kANO baLegaara
               allihudhennA thavarUru
 
               BANGLE SELLER: 
               muththaidhe ele heNNe thOru bA ninna thavarUrA
               muththaidhe ele heNNe thOru bA ninna thavarUrA
 
                LADY:          
               Ale AduththAvE gANa thiruguththAvE
               Ale AduththAvE gANa thiruguththAvE
               navilu saaranga nalidhAvE baLegaara
               allihudhennA thavarUru
 
                 BANGLE SELLER: 
               muththaidhe ele heNNe thOru bA ninna thavarUrA
               muththaidhe ele heNNe thOru bA ninna thavarUrA
 
                LADY:
               muththaidhe hattIli muththina chapra haasi
               muththaidhe hattIli muththina chapra haasi
               natta naduvElli pagadeya AduththaaLe
               natta naduvElli pagadeya AduththaaLe
               avaLe kaNO nanna hadedhavva
 
               BANGLE SELLER: 
               muththaidhe ele heNNe thOru bA ninna thavarUrA
               muththaidhe ele heNNe thOru bA ninna thavarUrA
 
                LADY:          
               achcha kempina baLe,hasiru gIrina baLe
               achcha kempina baLe,hasiru gIrina baLe
               nanna hadedhavvage balu Ase baLegaara
               nanna hadedhavvage balu Ase baLegaara
               kondu hOgo nanna thavarIge
                  
                 LADY:
               Bhaagyadha baLegaara hOgi bA nan thavarIgE
               Bhaagyadha baLegaara hOgi bA nan thavarIgE
               Bhaagyadha baLegaara hOgi bA nan thavarIgE
               Bhaagyadha baLegaara hOgi bA nan thavarIgE
 
               BANGLE SELLER: 
               ninna thavarUra nAnEga bllenu
               gotthAithu enage guriyAythu ele bAle
               hOgi barthini ninna thavrige
 
               LADY:          
               Bhaagyadha baLegaara hOgi bA nan thavarIgE
               Bhaagyadha baLegaara hOgi bA nan thavarIgE
 
               BANGLE SELLER: 
               mutthaide ele heNNe hOguve nin thavarige
 
               LADY:          
               Bhaagyadha baLegaara hOgi bA nan thavarIgE
 
               BANGLE SELLER: 
               mutthaide ele heNNe hOguve nin thavarige

English translation
 LADY:
               Dear Bangle seller,
               please go to my hometown
 
               BANGLE SELLER:
               how am I suppose to know which is your  hometown? 
               I Don't know the directions. Show me how to get there
 
               LADY:
               you'll see banana plantation at the right, 
               Guava plantation at the left,
               Please take the road which lies in between these two,
               it takes you to my home
 
               BANGLE SELLER:
               Hey newly married lady,
               Please show me your home
 
               LADY:
               The home built with red tiles and 
               the door is made from Bronze,
               there'll be two parrots singing, that's my home
 
               BANGLE SELLER:
               Hey newly married lady,
               Please show me your home
 
               LADY:
               Jaggery will be making, oil wheel will be rotating
               Peacocks, spotted deer will be dancing
               that's my hometown
 
                BANGLE SELLER:
               Hey newly married lady,
               Please show me your home
 
               LADY:
               The tent decorated with pearls- my mother still plays game of dice inside it 
               (Signifies that the celebration of marriage is not
               yet over and 
               the temporary construction erected for marriage related functions is still fresh).
 
               BANGLE SELLER:
               Hey newly married lady,
               Please show me your home
 
               LADY:
               My mother loves dark red bangles and 
               green bangle with cros..
               please take them there when you go there
 
               Dear fortune bangle seller
               please go to my hometown
 
               BANGLE SELLER:
               Now I know about your home, 
               I got the directions,
               I will certainly visit it.

References

Indian folk songs